Srdjan Stanković (born August 28, 1975) is a Macedonian former professional basketball player who played for Rabotnički, MZT Skopje, Kumanovo, Pelister, Žito Vardar Živa, Crn Drim and Ergonom from Niš. He was also member of Macedonian national basketball team

External links
 Srdjan Stanković profile at eurobasket.com
 Srdjan Stanković profile at bgbasket.com
 Srdjan Stanković profile at proballers.com
 Srdjan Stanković profile at sport195.com
 Srdjan Stanković profile at levskibasket.com

References

1975 births
Sportspeople from Skopje
Macedonian men's basketball players
Living people
Centers (basketball)
Macedonian people of Serbian descent
Macedonian expatriate basketball people in Serbia
KK Ergonom players
KK MZT Skopje players
KK Rabotnički players